Sardar Patel Vidyalaya (SPV) is an education school located in Lodhi Estate, New Delhi, India. The school is named after a leader of the Indian independence movement, and independent India's first Home Minister and Deputy Prime Minister, Sardar Vallabhbhai Patel.

Academics
It is a private school in India that employs Hindi as a medium of instruction in primary school. Though primarily subjects such as Math, science and social studies are taught in Hindi, students are taught 'technical terms' which are the English counterparts of whatever they learnt.

Students are provided instruction in four languages. From 1st grade, it is Hindi medium. English is the medium of education from the Class VI onwards. From Class VI, students have to choose between Gujarati, Tamil, Bengali and Urdu as their fourth language. Hindi and Sanskrit are mandatory until Class VIII. In Class IX, students are asked to choose between Hindi and Sanskrit.

Principals
 Raghubhai M. Nayak
 Vibha Parthasarathy
 Y K Mago (officiating)
 Mukesh Shelath
 Kusum Lata Warikoo
 Vijaya Subramaniam (officiating)
 Ms. Anuradha Joshi (2007–present)

Notable alumni

Administration and civil services and diplomatic services
 Achal Kumar Jyoti, Indian Administrative Service officer; Former Chief Election Commissioner of India, Former Chief Secretary, Commissioner of Education Govt of Gujarat 
 Vineeta Rai, Indian Administrative Service officer; former Revenue Secretary, Government of India
 Late Abhijit Sen, Padma Bhushan and Former Member of the Planning Commission of India
 TCA Raghvan, A former Indian diplomat of the Indian Foreign Service with considerable experience in South Asia policy issues and considered an expert on Pakistan studies.From 2013 to 2015 he was the High Commissioner of India to Pakistan. In July 2018 he was appointed Director General of the Indian Council of World Affairs.

Arts and media
Ketan Mehta, film director
Varun Badola, television actor 
Nandita Das, film actress, director 
Shahana Goswami, Bollywood actress 
Poorna Jagannathan, Hollywood and Bollywood actor and producer
Richa Chaddha, Bollywood actress 
 Anusha Rizvi, Bollywood film director
 Suraj Sharma, film actor 
Swara bhaskar, Bollywood actress 
Pakhi Tyrewala, actress
 Sudhir Pandey, veteran TV and film actor Well known for his performances in popular Doordarshan serials like Buniyaad
 Shrikrishan Sharma, a mastro of slide guitar and Vichitra Veena in Indian Classical Music. He featured in programmes broadcast by All India Radio and on television for over three decades
 Aditya Arya, has played a pivotal role in the establishment of India Photo Archive Foundation and the Neel Dongre Awards/Grants for Excellence in Photography, His India Photo Archive Foundation and The Municipal Corporation of Gurugram, has set up Museo Camera, in Gurugram that is dedicated to the art and history of photography.

Literature
Aman Sethi, Writer and Correspondent for The Hindu

Corporate
S. Ramadorai, CEO, Tata Consultancy Services and recipient of the Padma Bhushan
Sanjay Mehrotra, CEO of Micron Technology and co-founder of SanDisk
Siddiq Anwar

Science and technology
Kapil Hari Paranjape, Mathematician
Vidyut Mohan, social entrepreneur and Earthshot Prize winner

Academia 

 Shalini Randeria, A Rhodes Scholar and social anthropologist/sociologist. She was Rector of the Institute for Human Sciences (IWM) in Vienna and Professor of Social Anthropology and Sociology at the Graduate Institute of International and Development Studies (IHEID) in Geneva, where she was also Director of the Albert Hirschman Centre on Democracy. She holds the Excellence Chair at the University of Bremen, where she leads a research group on “soft authoritarianisms"
 Mohit Randeria, Professor, Department of Physics, Ohio State University,  Fellow of the American Physical Society, Distinguished Alumni Award, Indian Institute of Technology, Delhi  Government of India for scientific research, awarded him the Shanti Swarup Bhatnagar Prize for Science and Technology.
 Shivaji Sondhi, A theoretical physicist who is currently the Wykeham Professor of Physics in the Rudolf Peierls Centre for Theoretical Physics at the University of Oxford
 Sandeep Marwah, media and film production educator. Founder of Marwah Studios

Environmentalism 

 Ashish Kothari, has been a member of Steering Committees of the World Commission on Protected Areas (WCPA) and IUCN Commission on Environmental, Economic, and Social Policy (CEESP) He has also been a teacher of environment at Indian Institute of Public Administration, New Delhi.

Adventure/Mountaineering

Sports 
Deep Dasgupta, Indian cricket team
Ajay Jadeja, Indian cricket team and TV commentator
Murali Kartik, Indian cricket team
Gagan Khoda, Indian cricket team
Vivek Razdan, Indian cricket team
Rahul Sanghvi, Indian cricket team
Tejaswin Shankar, Indian Track and field

Law
Karuna Nundy, Supreme Court Advocate

References

External links
 
 
 The official alumni network

Private schools in Delhi
Educational institutions established in 1957
Memorials to Vallabhbhai Patel
1957 establishments in Delhi